Carlo Perrone (born 8 July 1960) is an Italian professional football manager and a former player, currently in charge as head coach of Olhanense.

Career

Playing career
A Vicenza youth product, Perrone made his professional debut in 1977 with hometown club Padova. He successively played at Serie B level for many years, then winning promotion to Serie A during his spell with Bari, with whom he debuted in the Italian top flight.

He successively joined Serie A team Atalanta in 1990, with whom he also played at UEFA Cup level. Perrone retired in 1995 after a single season with Padova, then at Serie A level too.

Post-playing and coaching career
Following his retirement as an active player, Perrone became a chief scout for Venezia between 1997 and 1999, then filling the same duty at Verona between 1999 and 2001. He then served as director of football for Südtirol before turning into a coaching career.

After some experiences as a youth coach for Padova and Cittadella, Perrone took over as manager of Eccellenza amateurs Piovese in 2009. He successively joined Novara as an assistant coach, also acting as a co-head coach (together with Giacomo Gattuso) in 2012. He then returned into amateur level management with Eccellenza clubs Piovese, Giorgione and Castelbaldo Masi.

In July 2021 he was unveiled as the new head coach of S.C. Olhanense, succeeding Edgar Davids in the job.

References

1960 births
Living people
Italian footballers
Serie A players
Serie B players
S.S.C. Bari players
Atalanta B.C. players
Empoli F.C. players
Italian football managers
Association football midfielders

it:Carlo Perrone (calciatore 8 luglio 1960)